Cochylimorpha discolorana is a species of moth of the family Tortricidae. It is found in Romania, Ukraine, Russia (south-eastern European Russia, Transalai, the Caucasus), Azerbaijan, Georgia, Kazakhstan, Central Asia, Afghanistan and Iran.

The wingspan is 17–19 mm. Adults have been recorded on wing from April to June.

References

 
 

D
Moths of Asia
Moths of Europe
Moths described in 1899